Michael Norton may refer to:

 Michael Norton (politician) (1837–1889), American politician from New York
 Michael Norton (professor) (born 1975), professor of business administration at Harvard Business School
 Michael Norton (skier) (1964–1996), Australian Paralympic alpine skier
 Michael J. Norton, American attorney
 Mike Norton, American comic book artist and writer